Fifteen Quiet Years is a compilation album by American math rock band Rodan, released on June 11, 2013 through Quarterstick Records. It consists of several tracks originally released only on compilations as well as recordings from the band's BBC session with John Peel. All the songs have been newly mastered by Bob Weston for their inclusion in Fifteen Quiet Years. All formats include a digital download of ten bonus live tracks.

Track listing

Personnel 
Rodan
Kevin Coultas – drums
Jon Cook – drums
Jeff Mueller – guitar, vocals, remastering
Jason B. Noble – guitar, vocals, remastering
Tara Jane O'Neil – bass guitar, guitar, vocals
John Weiss – drums
Production and additional personnel
David Babbitt – cover art
Lance Bangs – engineering
Julia Carney – engineering
Ted de Bono – engineering
Forrest French – engineering
Steve Good – engineering
Aadam Jacobs – engineering
Patrick Klem – engineering
Kevin Ratterman – mastering
Cory Rayborn – engineering
Rodan – mastering
Bob Weston – remastering

References 

2013 compilation albums
Quarterstick Records compilation albums
Rodan (band) albums